Roy Neil Ferguson, is the former New Zealand Ambassador to the United States. He was replaced by former New Zealand Prime Minister and Director-General of the World Trade Organization Mike Moore in 2010. Ferguson replaced John Wood in the role in 2006. He was Director of the Americas Division in the Ministry of Foreign Affairs and Trade from 2002 to 2005, and has served on the Boards of the New Zealand-United States Council, Fulbright New Zealand, the Ian Axford Fellowships, and the New Zealand Centre for Latin American Studies. Ferguson previously served in Washington as Deputy Chief of Mission between 1991 and 1995. From 1999 to 2002 he served as the New Zealand Ambassador to South Korea and concurrently served as Ambassador to North Korea from 2001. He has also served in Manila and Canberra.

Ferguson received an MA in History and Political Science from the University of Canterbury, and was awarded the Canterbury Fellowship and a Fulbright Travel Grant which enabled him to study at the University of Pennsylvania, from which he graduated with an MA in International Relations.  He attended the six-week Advanced Management Program at Harvard Business School.

After his stint as Ambassador to the United States of America, Ferguson was Director, Intelligence Coordination Group, Department of the Prime Minister and Cabinet.

Honours

In the 2014 Queen's Birthday Honours, Ferguson was appointed a Companion of the Queen's Service Order, for services to the State.

See also
 Embassy of New Zealand in Washington
 List of ambassadors of New Zealand to the United States

References

External links 
New Zealand Embassy in Washington
United States Embassy in Wellington
 The Washington Diplomat Newspaper – Ambassador Profile 

Living people
University of Canterbury alumni
University of Pennsylvania alumni
Year of birth missing (living people)
Ambassadors of New Zealand to the United States
Ambassadors of New Zealand to South Korea
Companions of the Queen's Service Order
Ambassadors of New Zealand to North Korea